SUO or Suo may refer to:

 Suō Province of Japan
 Suo, a soil science journal
 Senior Under Officer, a military cadet rank in Commonwealth nations
 Standard upper ontology, in computing
 The IATA identifier for Sunriver Airport in Sunriver, Oregon, USA
 "Solution User Options", in Visual Studio parlance
 SUO, National Rail code for Sutton railway station (London)